Liz Collins (born 1968) is an American contemporary artist and designer. Collins is recognized for her artwork involving fabric, knitwear, and textiles as well as the fashion label she developed. She has expertise in textile media including the transition of fabric into multi-dimensional forms as a method to vary the scale of her pieces to make them architectural and inviting rather than object-based. Collins is based in Brooklyn, New York.

Early life and education 
Liz Collins graduated with a BFA degree (1991) and MFA degree (1999) from Rhode Island School of Design (RISD). Collins launched her personal knitwear clothing line in 1999 as her MFA thesis at RISD and ran her business until 2004.

She was a professor of textiles at RISD from 2003 to 2013.

Career 
After receiving her M.F.A., Collins spent the next several years developing her own knitwear company until 2004. Recognized for its innovative design, Collins developed a patent for her specialized technique of interweaving and assembling different materials to construct her garments. The label gained popularity, celebrity recognition, and media coverage. Collins became a member of the Council of Fashion Designers of America in 1999 from her personal brand.  In the middle stages of her fashion design career, she could no longer afford to finance her label's labor wages and meet society's demand of product. Collins soon began to outsource her products which is when she felt disconnected with her creative process and missed the hands-on aspect of designing garments. 

Once the fashion label closed, Collins then returned to RISD to teach textiles as an associate professor, until 2013. She has also taught at the School of the Art Institute of Chicago, Moore College of Art, Pratt Institute, the Maryland Institute College of Art, and Parsons School of Design. In 2017, Collins served as a mentor to Marco DaSilva in Queer Art's Fellowship program.

"Knit-Grafting" 
"Knit-Grafting" is a term created by Liz Collins used to describe her artistic process of reconstructing garments, and is most specifically used in her work as a fashion designer. This term stemmed from the fundamental of Grafting, which is the process of intertwining two or more fabrics together. Collin's Knit-Grafting incorporates numerous panels of fabrics as well fusing various materials together. These materials may include Lace, Metals, and other mediums used to make her design stand out.

Knitting Nation 
As a response to the fashion industry she previously worked within, Collins launched Knitting Nation. KN was a multi-part installation and performance project that spanned the course of several years and was globally spread. It was a site-specific installation with collaborative performance that revealed some facets of the textile and apparel manufacturing processes by demonstrating costumed seamstresses manually working on knitting machines. The objective of this work was to bring awareness to topics such as sexuality and gender within fashion, labor, and the issue of sustainable practices through immersive, visual means. Crafting is filled with power hierarchies and gender nuances that are centered around the LGBTQ+ culture as fiber-based crafts like embroidery, knitting, and sewing examine the numerous preferences of society and raise reactions of those disapproving. More specifically, Knitting Nation Phase 4 was titled "Pride" to admire and acknowledge the original rainbow flag of the LGBTQ+ Community. This installation was a hand knit rainbow flag that was displayed at the front and center steps of a park in Providence, Rhode Island for six hours.

Other work 

Other artwork by Liz Collins incorporates recycled textiles from previous art pieces, abstract designs, and structural components like poles and fences. These pieces typically entertain a diverse color palette, and explore themes such as human interconnectedness and cosmic energy. Her work exists on a plane of varying size such as intimate, fibrous wall hangings to life size installations that transport the audience to a temporary alternative universe. Collins emphasizes interactive multi-media art that embodies various textures, scents, and colors in the materials to help make the audience's experiences multi-sensory.

In 2022, Collins was commissioned to create the installation Every Which Way (2022) for Meta’s Manhattan office complex in the historic James A. Farley Building.

Exhibitions

Solo exhibitions

 2005: Knoxville Museum of Art, Knoxville, Tennessee
 2006: RISD, Providence, Rhode Island
 2008: Rhode Island School of Design Museum, Providence, Rhode Island
 2011: Institute of Contemporary Art, Boston, Boston, Massachusetts
 2011: Institute of Contemporary Art, Boston, Boston, Massachusetts
 2012: Museum of Modern Art (MoMA), New York City
2016: Museum of Art and Design (MAD), New York City – featuring a time-based performance and installation

Collections 
Collins has public collections in museums and gallery spaces across the country, which include the Museum of Arts & Design in New York, New York; the FIT Museum in New York, NY, the RISD Museum in Providence, RI, the Tang Museum in Saratoga Springs, New York, the Leslie-Lohmann Museum of Art in New York, NY, and the School of Art Institute of Chicago and the Fashion Resource Center in Chicago, IL.

Awards
 United States Artist Target Fellowship, 2006
 MacColl Johnson Fellowship, 2011
 CeCArtsLink Grant with intentions to produce a Knitting Nation installation in Croatia.

References

External links 
Official Website
https://madmuseum.org/learn/liz-collins
https://academicaffairs.risd.edu/tag/liz-collins/

American fashion designers
Rhode Island School of Design alumni
Textile artists
Maryland Institute College of Art faculty
School of the Art Institute of Chicago faculty
Moore College of Art and Design faculty
Pratt Institute faculty
American LGBT artists
Living people
1968 births